Bernhard Kamnitzer (25 October 1890 – 15 July 1959) was a German jurist and Senator of the Free City of Danzig.

Biography

Kamnitzer was born in Dirschau (modern Tczew, Poland), he studied law at the Universities of Danzig (modern Gdansk) and Königsberg (modern Kaliningrad).
Kamnitzer served in World War I and was severely wounded, he later worked as a lawyer and a judge in Danzig. He was a member of the executive board of the Centralverein Danziger Staatsbürger jüdischen Glaubens (CV; Central Association of Danzig Citizens of Jewish faith), of the Social Democratic Party of the Free City of Danzig and the Danzig parliament in 1924-28. He was Senator (minister) for Finances of the Free City of Danzig between 1928 and 1931. In 1938 Kamnitzer emigrated to Great Britain and later to the United States, where he became President of the American Danzig Association.

Kamnitzer died in New York City.

References

1890 births
1959 deaths
People from Tczew
People from West Prussia
German Jewish military personnel of World War I
University of Königsberg alumni
Free City of Danzig politicians
Jewish emigrants from Nazi Germany to the United States